Manuel Lopes may refer to:

 Manuel Lopes Rodrigues (1860-1917), Brazilian painter
 Manuel Lopes (barber) (died 1895), Cape Verdean-American barber
 Manuel Lopes (writer) (1907-1935), Cape Verdean poet and writer
 Manuel Lopes (footballer) (born 2000), Portuguese footballer

See also
 Manuel López (disambiguation)